David A. Jaffray is a Canadian medical physicist and Senior Scientist in the Division of Biophysics and Bioimaging at the Ontario Cancer Institute. He is also a professor and Vice Chair in the University of Toronto's Department of Radiation Oncology.  He is the inventor, together with John Wong and Jeffrey Siewerdsen, of on-line volumetric kv-imaging guidance system for radiation therapy.

He was named as one of "Canada's Top 40 Under 40" in 2003 by Caldwell Partners.

On 21 May 2019, the University of Texas MD Anderson Cancer Center announced that Jaffray would be joining the institution as its "first chief technology and digital officer".

Publications
 Cited by 126

References

CTV News – Treatment allows better targeting of tumours. Updated Sat. Nov. 13 2004 9:39 PM ET
The Globe and Mail, David Jaffray: Image Maker

External links
Research at University Health Network –  David A. Jaffray, PhD, Senior Scientist, Division of Biophysics and Bioimaging, Ontario Cancer Institute (OCI)
University of Toronto, Department of Medical Biophysics – David Jaffray

Canadian physicists
Living people
Year of birth missing (living people)
Academic staff of the University of Toronto
Medical physicists
Scientists from Toronto